José Manuel Artiles Romero (born 10 June 1993) is a Spanish professional footballer who plays for Hércules as a winger or forward.

Football career
Born in Sardina del Sur, Province of Las Palmas, Canary Islands, Artiles finished his formation with UD Las Palmas, and made his senior debuts with the reserves in 2009–10 season, in the Tercera División.

On 25 September 2011 Artiles made his debut as a professional, playing the entire second half of a 0–1 home loss against Córdoba CF in the Segunda División. On 26 August 2015, after appearing mainly with the B-side, he was loaned to Racing de Santander of the Segunda División B for a year.

On 20 January 2017, Artiles was loaned to fellow third-tier club FC Cartagena, until June. On 9 August of the following year, after spending the previous campaign exclusively with Las Palmas' B-team, he signed a two-year contract with Lleida Esportiu in the third division.

In January 2023, Artiles signed for Hércules.

References

External links

1993 births
Living people
Spanish footballers
Footballers from the Canary Islands
Association football wingers
Association football forwards
Segunda División players
Segunda División B players
Tercera División players
UD Las Palmas Atlético players
UD Las Palmas players
Racing de Santander players
FC Cartagena footballers
Lleida Esportiu footballers
CD El Ejido players
CD Don Benito players
Mérida AD players
Hércules CF players